Audrey Beck may refer to:

 Audrey Jones Beck (1924–2003), philanthropist in Houston
 Audrey P. Beck (1931–1983), American politician and educator